Acrocercops achnodes is a moth of the family Gracillariidae, known from Ecuador. It was named by Edward Meyrick in 1915.

References

achnodes
Moths of South America
Moths described in 1915